Sub Zero Project is a Dutch hardstyle producer duo, consisting of Thomas Velderman (born 19 April 1996) and Nigel Coppen (born 9 March 1997), most known for making the Qlimax 2018 anthem "The Game Changer". They are the youngest Qlimax anthem makers in history.

History 
Nigel Coppen initially made music under the name Sub Zero. He came into contact with Thomas Velderman via YouTube; they listened to each other's tracks and then decided to work together. Velderman joined Coppen and "Project" was added to the name to clarify that it was a duo. In December 2013, at the ages of 16 and 17 respectively, Nigel and Thomas signed with the Belgian hardstyle record label Dirty Workz.

In 2017 Nigel and Thomas both graduated from the Herman Brood Academy, a production school in Utrecht, as Artist Popmusic Dance Producers. The same year they released "The Project", their first hardstyle hit, which led to them receiving widespread attention for their use of psy-style kicks with aggressive attacks, blended with hardstyle elements. This came accompanied with a new live act, featuring the duo's faces being painted in the form of their logo.

In 2018 the duo released "The XPRMNT", which as well came with a new live act featuring a change in attire. Q-Dance chose the duo to create the Qlimax 2018 anthem, titled "The Game Changer".. Also in 2018, the duo would make their first collab with Australian House producer: Timmy Trumpet titled "Rockstar" which is one of 3 collabs with the famous artist.
In 2019, the duo released "The Contagion", which served as the lead track for their debut album titled Contagion. In less than three months, their debut album reached over 10 million streams on Spotify.

In 2022, Sub Zero Project would release their 2nd album titled “Renaissance of Rave” This album would feature the popular songs, HALO,200 Beathoven and Soft Ass Shit. The album has been described by Headhunterz as the “Best Hardstyle production since Love it or Hate it, This is Hard with STYLE”

Sub Zero Project has made the DJ Mag Top 100 list – 95th in 2019, 123rd in 2020 and 131st in 2021.

Discography

References

Dutch record producers
Hardstyle musicians
1996 births
Living people